Aspirin(acetylsalicylic acid) / paracetamol(acetaminophen) / caffeine is a combination drug for the treatment of pain, especially tension headache and migraine. It is sold in the US under the trade names Goody's Powder and Excedrin, although not all products sold under the Excedrin brand contain this combination. It is sold in the UK under various brandnames including Anadin Extra.

Adverse effects 

The recommended dosing has a low risk profile when taken occasionally in a well hydrated state. As with all medications containing paracetamol (acetaminophen), concomitant use with alcohol carries a significant risk of hepatotoxicity. The combination of paracetamol with aspirin also creates the risk of renal papillary necrosis if large doses are taken chronically. This is because paracetamol yields a toxic metabolite that can accumulate in the kidney while aspirin works to deplete the glutathione stores necessary to oxidize it. Additionally, chronic aspirin usage is associated with increased risk of gastrointestinal bleeding.

Chemical detection
The combination of these three compounds can be detected in pharmaceutical formulations, urine and blood serum in trace quantities using electrochemical methods.

Other trade names
The combination was introduced in 1950, sold as the name Triagesic. In 1964 it was marketed under the trade name Vanquish by Sterling Drug, which after a series of mergers and acquisitions became a unit of Bayer AG.

In Germany, it is sold as dolomo, Dolopyrin AL, HA-Tabletten, Melabon K, Neuralgin, ratiopyrin, Thomapyrin Classic, Thomapyrin Intensiv, in Austria as Thomapyrin, and InfluASS, in Israel as Acamol Focus, Paramol Target and Exidol, in Romania as Antinevralgic P  and Antinevralgic Forte, and in Russia, Belarus and Eastern Europe as Citramon.

References 

Analgesics
Combination drugs
Aspirin
Novartis brands
GSK plc brands